Walter Francis Rooney (31 March 1902 – 1963) was an English professional footballer who played as a wing half. He made appearances in the English Football League for Everton and Wrexham.

References

1902 births
1963 deaths
English footballers
Association football defenders
Everton F.C. players
Wrexham A.F.C. players
Runcorn F.C. Halton players
Northwich Victoria F.C. players
English Football League players